The Chief Witness (German: Die Kronzeugin) is a 1937 German crime drama film directed by Georg Jacoby and starring Iván Petrovich, Sybille Schmitz and Sabine Peters.  It was shot at the Babelsberg Studios in Berlin. The film's sets were designed by the art directors Otto Hunte and Willy Schiller. Location shooting took place in the Krkonose Mountains in Czechoslovakia and Zugspitze in Bavaria.

Cast
 Iván Petrovich as Stefan Laurin
 Sybille Schmitz as 	Jelena Rakowska
 Sabine Peters as 	Nina Rakowska
 Gustav Waldau as 	Georg Radloff
 Elga Brink as Elise Laurin
 Ursula Grabley as 	Rose Bonnet
 Ursula Herking as 	Babett
 Rudolf Platte as Kriminalassistent Malapert
 Just Scheu as 	Dr. Sanders
 Georg H. Schnell as 	Gerichtsvorsitzender
 Ernst Dumcke as 	Staatsanwalt
 Werner Pledath as 	Untersuchungsrichter
 Hermann Pfeiffer as 	Regisseur
 Josefine Dora as 	Souffleuse Krüger
 Harry Hardt as Sänger
 Hanni Weisse as 	Stefan Laurins Wirtschafterin
 Olga Schaub as Gast bei Jelena
 Dorothea Thiess as 	Ninas Zimmermädchen
 Ellinor Büller as 	Krankenschwester
 Rudolf Klix as 	Konsul Runge
 Hermann Meyer-Falkow as 	Pianist
 Erich Walter as Diener Williams
 Wolfgang Grube as 	Arzt
 Willy Kaufman as 	Kriminalbeamter Lüdecke
 Gustav Mahnke as Schlafwagenschaffner
 Erich Dunskus as 	Kriminalkommissar Geller
 Eduard Bornträger as 	Polizeifotograf
 Max Wilmsen as Kriminalbeamter
 Christine Grabe as Krankenschwester
 Adi Solta as 	Inspizient

References

Bibliography 
 Bock, Hans-Michael & Töteberg, Michael . Das Ufa-Buch. Zweitausendeins, 1992.
 Giesen, Rolf. The Nosferatu Story: The Seminal Horror Film, Its Predecessors and Its Enduring Legacy. McFarland, 2019.
 Rentschler, Eric. The Ministry of Illusion: Nazi Cinema and Its Afterlife. Harvard University Press, 1996.

External links 
 

1937 films
Films of Nazi Germany
1937 crime drama films
1937 drama films
German crime drama films
1937 crime films
1930s German-language films
Films directed by Georg Jacoby
UFA GmbH films
German black-and-white films
German films based on plays
1930s German films
Films shot at Babelsberg Studios
Films shot in the Czech Republic